Bang Muang is one of the six subdistricts (tambon) of Bang Yai District, in Nonthaburi Province, Thailand. Neighbouring subdistricts are (from north clockwise) Bang Mae Nang, Sao Thong Hin, Bang Len, Bang Khu Wiang, Plai Bang, Sala Klang and Bang Yai. In 2020 it had a total population of 19,518 people.

Administration

Central administration
The subdistrict is subdivided into 15 administrative villages (muban).

Local administration
The area of the subdistrict is shared by two local administrative organizations.
Bang Muang Subdistrict Municipality
Ban Bang Muang Subdistrict Municipality

References

External links
Website of Bang Muang Subdistrict Municipality
Website of Ban Bang Muang Subdistrict Municipality

Tambon of Nonthaburi province
Populated places in Nonthaburi province